Abelmoschus manihot, the aibika, is a flowering plant in the family Malvaceae. It was formerly considered a species of Hibiscus, but is now classified in the genus Abelmoschus.  The plant is also known as the sunset muskmallow, sunset hibiscus, or hibiscus manihot.

Applications

In the Philippines it is known variously as lagikway, likway, gikway, barakue, or nating saluyot. Its leaves and shoots are eaten as a vegetable, similar to the related saluyot (Corchorus olitorius). The leaves are added to dishes like tinola, sinigang, and pinangat, or eaten in salads.

In Japanese, this plant is known as tororo aoi and is used to make neri, a starchy substance used in making the traditional Japanese paper washi. In Korean, this plant is known as hwang chok kyu and is used to make dak pul, which assists in making hanji (Korean paper).

Chemical constituents
A chromatographic and spectroscopic analysis published in China Journal of Chinese Materia Medica showed that aibika contained thirteen compounds: myricetin, cannabiscitrin, myricetin-3-O-beta-D-glucopyranoside, glycerolmonopalmitate, 2, 4-dihydroxy benzoic acid, guanosine, adenosine, maleic acid, heptatriacontanoic acid, 1-triacontanol, tetracosane, β-Sitosterol, and beta-sitosterol-3-O-beta-D-glucoside.

Nutrition
Although technically a shrub, aibika is a perennial which, under good conditions, can grow to over three meters in height.  It is reputedly an extremely nutritious vegetable. Its leaves are very high in vitamins A and C, and iron, and have 12% protein by dry weight. Moreover, it is easily propagated from cuttings, easy to cultivate, relatively disease-resistant and even is considered to be of medicinal value. It is widely planted either along borders of gardens or as an intercrop throughout many traditional gardens in the tropics.

References

External links
Abelmoschus manihot (L.) Medic. Medicinal Plant Images Database (School of Chinese Medicine, Hong Kong Baptist University)  

manihot
Flora of China
Flora of the Indian subcontinent
Flora of Malesia
Flora of New Guinea
Oceanian cuisine
Melanesian cuisine
Polynesian cuisine
Taxa named by Carl Linnaeus